Summerhouse is a village in the borough of Darlington and the ceremonial county of County Durham, England. It is situated a few miles to the north-west of Darlington. The population of the civil parish taken at the 2011 Census was 143. Since 2009 it has been home to the two Michelin star restaurant The Raby Hunt.

References

External links

Villages in County Durham
Places in the Borough of Darlington
Places in the Tees Valley